Dimock is a surname. Notable people with the surname include:

Bill Dimock (1923–2016), Canadian ice hockey player
Davis Dimock Jr. (1801–1842), American politician
Edith Dimock (1876–1955), American painter
Edward Jordan Dimock (1890–1986), American judge
Henry F. Dimock (1842–1911), American lawyer
Ichabod Dimock (d. 1858), Canadian farmer, magistrate and political figure
Shubael Dimock (c. 1753–1834), Canadian political figure
Susan Dimock (1847–1875), American physician
Susan Ann Dimock, Canadian philosopher and professor 
Timothy Dimock (1799–1874), American physician and politician
Wai Chee Dimock, American professor
Wilbert David Dimock (1846–1930), Canadian educator, journalist and politician